Adelaide of Bohemia (1105 or 1107 – 15 September 1140) was a daughter of Prince Álmos of Hungary and his wife Predslava of Kiev, daughter of Sviatopolk II great prince of Kiev. Adelaide's father was a son of King Géza I of Hungary and was Duke and later King of East Slavonia.

Adelaide married Soběslav I, Duke of Bohemia. They had at least five children:
 Vladislaus, Duke at Olomouc
 Maria
 Soběslav II (~1128–1180), Duke of Bohemia
 Udalrich II (1134–1170), Duke at Olomouc
 Wenceslaus II (1137–1192), Duke of Bohemia

References

Sources

Duchesses of Bohemia
1100s births
1140 deaths
Year of birth uncertain
House of Árpád